Colmenar de Montemayor is a municipality in the province of Salamanca, in the autonomous community of Castile and Leon, Spain. Its postal code is 37711.

Geography

History 
It was founded by the king Alfonso IX of Leon in the 13th century.

Demographics 
It has a population of 189 people (2015).

Monuments 
 Church of Nuestra Señora de la Asunción.
 House of the nobleman.
 House of the Chantre.
 Hermitage of Nuestra Señora de la Consolación.

References

Municipalities in the Province of Salamanca